Lee Young-hee (Hangul: , also spelled Lee Young Hee; February 24, 1936 – May 17, 2018) was a South Korean fashion designer. She worked on designing hanbok, Korean traditional clothes, to increase the awareness of traditional Korean dress to the Western world since the early 1990s.

She was the representative of Miraemunhwa foundation, and operated Maison de Lee Young Hee in Gangnam-gu, Seoul.

Fashion
Young-hee majored in dying design at Sungshin Women's University. In 1976 she opened her own shop under the title of "Lee Young Hee Korean clothes". In 1983 she joined the international festival in Washington D.C. to celebrate the independence of the United States.

In 1993, she first made her debut in the Pret-a-Porter in Paris.

In 1993, she became the first, along with Lee Shin Woo, to be allowed to participate in pret-a-porte while establishing a hanbok boutique in Paris the following year. She continued to introduce unique design and style of oriental clothes and Korean culture in Europe. Her thought was flowed through modern style in that old-fashioned hanbok has difficulties of daily life such as movement.

In 2003, she donated 12 sets of hanbok to Smithsonian Museum of Natural History, in the hopes of setting up a Korean gallery, which was opened in 2008. Lee was then required to design traditional wedding hanbok for the Smithsonian for months afterwards, adding ornaments.

In 2004, the Lee Young Hee Museum of Korean Culture was inaugurated in Manhattan, New York City. This hall has been utilized to hold hanbok fashion shows and display traditional culture.

Her design has features of involving elegant color and a neat silhouette, with the mixture of past and current styles.

When the APEC summit was held in Busan, South Korea, she became in charge of preparing outer garments (durumagi) of 21 heads attending the event.

During her final years the Korean media spotlight came down upon her for having  designed various hanbok for a famous South Korean couple, Jang Dong Gun and Go So Young and also for their relatives for their wedding.

Lee Young Hee also designed hanbok for the first ladies of South Korea such as, Lee Soon-ja, Kim Ok-sook, and also Kim Yoon-ok, first lady to previous president Lee Myung Bak, who was in office during rrom 2008 until 2013.

Autobiography
In 2009, she published an autobiography, 《Hanbok Designer leaving for Paris》. In her book, she said "I've learned the philosophy and my life via hanbok".

References

1936 births
2018 deaths
People from Daegu
South Korean fashion designers
South Korean women fashion designers
Recipients of the Order of Cultural Merit (Korea)
Deaths from pneumonia in South Korea
South Korean Buddhists